Wietze Couperus (born 16 March 1942) is a Dutch footballer. He played in one match for the Netherlands national football team in 1970.

References

External links
 

1942 births
Living people
Dutch footballers
Netherlands international footballers
People from Sneek
Association football forwards
Blauw-Wit Amsterdam players
SC Cambuur players
HFC Haarlem players
ADO Den Haag players
FC Amsterdam players
SC Telstar players